Oxynoe delicatula is a species of small sea snail or sea slug, a bubble snail, a marine gastropod mollusk in the family Oxynoidae.

Distribution
The type locality for this species is Sri Lanka.

Description
The shell is ovate, involute, a little contracted and truncate behind, rounded in front, whitish and thin. The aperture is subcircular behind, ovate in front, elongated, dilated, margins approximating toward the posterior terminations. The inner lip is smooth and thin. The outer lip a little inflexed behind. The peristome is acute.

The height of the shell is 6 mm. The width of the shell is 3.5 mm.

References
This article incorporates oublic domain text from the reference.

Further reading
Nevill. Journ. Asiat. Soc. Beng., xxxviii, pt. 2, 67, pi. 13, f. 5.
Angas. (1877) P. Z. S. p. 190. (As Lophocercus delicatulus.)

Oxynoidae
Gastropods described in 1869